The Primera División Uruguaya 2005 started on 5 March 2005 and ended on 12 July 2005.

The league was a single round-robin tournament and not relegation and promotion from Segunda División Uruguay. But along with Apertura 2005 of 2005–06 season, the whole schedule of 2005 would count in a final table, the bottom three would direct relegated. The winners qualified for 2006 Copa Libertadores.

Standings

Championship tiebreaker
Defensor Sporting refused to play the tiebreaker match due to Nacional winning their last match by a contested penalty in 7th minute of injury time. Nacional was awarded the championship on 6 July 2005.

Topscorers

External links
RSSSF

Uruguayan Primera División seasons
Uru
1